was head of the Shimazu clan in Japan. 
He was adopted father of Shimazu Takahisa (son of Shimazu Tadayoshi).

References

Daimyo
1503 births
1573 deaths